Promiscuity may refer to:

Promiscuity,  the practice of making relatively casual and indiscriminate choices, most commonly applied to sexual behaviour and referred to as Sexual promiscuity
"Promiscuity," a song by Manu Chao from his 2000 album Próxima Estación: Esperanza
"Promiscuity," a song by Antigone from her 2009 debut album AntigoneLand

See also 
 Promiscuous mode